The 1882 Victorian Football Association season was the sixth season of the Australian rules football competition. The premiership was won by the Geelong Football Club. It was the club's fourth VFA premiership in just five seasons, and was the first in a sequence of three consecutive premierships won from 1882 to 1884.

Association membership 
The senior metropolitan membership of the Association (including Geelong) during 1882 was seven, the same clubs that had competed in 1881: , East Melbourne, Hotham, and South Melbourne.

At this time, three other provincial senior clubs were full Association members represented on the Board of Management for a total membership of ten: Ballarat, Benalla and Horsham. Due to distance, these clubs played too few matches against the rest of the VFA to be considered relevant in the premiership.

1882 VFA premiership 
The 1882 premiership was won by the Geelong Football Club. Geelong won ten and drew two of its thirteen senior matches for the season, a considerably better record than second-placed , which won five and drew five of its twelve senior matches.

Club senior records 
The below table details the playing records of the seven clubs in all matches during the 1882 season, where the information is available. Two sets of results are given:
 Senior results: based only upon games played against other VFA senior clubs.
 Total results: including senior games, and games against intercolonial, up-country and junior clubs.

While East Melbourne was a senior club, in practice they played to a junior standard, and in its few matches against the other senior clubs were routinely beaten by large margins. Consequently, the Australasian and the Leader newspapers did not include matches against East Melbourne in teams' senior results, and this approach has been replicated in the table below.

The clubs are listed in the order in which they were ranked in the Australasian newspaper. The VFA had no formal process by which the clubs were ranked, so the below order should be considered indicative only, particularly since the fixturing of matches was not standardised; however, the top three placings were later acknowledged in publications including the Football Record and are considered official.

Notable events 
 James Garton replaced Sir William Clarke, MLC as president of the Association. Clarke had served in the role since 1877.
 The leading goalkicker for the season was McLean, who kicked a new Association record of 25 goals (15 in senior matches).
 Several leading clubs went on interstate trips during the season:
  travelled to South Australia in June, winning four matches against local clubs and winning one game at odds against a combined team of local juniors.
  travelled to New South Wales in July, winning three matches against local clubs, one against the combined New South Wales team, and one against Albury.
  travelled to Tasmania in August, winning three matches against regional teams and one against the combined state team.
 Victoria was also visited by South Australian club Norwood in June and July, which won one out of three matches against VFA clubs.

External links 
 Victorian Football Association/Victorian Football League History (1877-2008)
 List of VFA/VFL Premiers (1877-2007)
 History of Australian rules football in Victoria (1853-1900)

References 

Victorian Football League seasons
Vfa Season, 1882